This is a list of schools in Rocky Mount, North Carolina.

Higher education 
 North Carolina Wesleyan College 
 Nash Community College 
 Edgecombe Community College (Rocky Mount campus)

Public schools

High schools 
Nash Central High School
Nash Rocky Mount Early College
 The Centre for Industry Technology and Innovation
Northern Nash High School
Rocky Mount High School
Southern Nash High School
Southwest Edgecombe High School

Middle schools 
Edwards Middle School
Nash Central Middle School
Parker Middle School
Red Oak Middle School
Rocky Mount Middle School
Southern Nash Middle School
West Edgecombe Middle School

Elementary schools 
Bailey Elementary School
Baskerville Elementary School
Benvenue Elementary School
Braswell Elementary School
Cedar Grove Elementary School
Coopers Elementary School
Englewood Elementary School
GW Bulluck Elementary
Hubbard Elementary School
Johnson Elementary School
Middlesex Elementary School
Nashville Elementary School
Pope Elementary School
Red Oak Elementary School
Spring Hope Elementary School
Swift Creek Elementary School
Williford Elementary School
Winstead Avenue Elementary School

Alternative and Exceptional schools 
 Nash Rocky Mount Early College
 WL Greene Alternative School
 Tar River Academy

Charter schools 
 Rocky Mount Preparatory School

Private schools 
 Cornerstone Christian Academy
 Crown of Victory Christian School
 Faith Christian School
 New Life Christian Academy
 Grace Christian School
 Our Lady of Perpetual Help (OLPH)
 Showers of Blessing Christian Academy
 Rocky Mount Academy

References

Rocky Mount
Rocky Mount, North Carolina